Macon Anderson Leiper (July 25, 1879 – June 17, 1936) was an American football  coach and college professor. He served as the head football coach at Western Kentucky University (then known as Western Normal School) during the 1913 college football season. Leiper also served as a professor of modern languages at WKU from 1908 until his death in 1936.

References

External links
 

1879 births
1936 deaths
Columbia University alumni
Princeton University alumni
Western Kentucky Hilltoppers baseball coaches
Western Kentucky Hilltoppers football coaches
Western Kentucky University faculty
People from Malvern, Arkansas